Squamura is a genus of moths in the family Cossidae.

Species
 Squamura acutistriata (Mell, 1923)
 Squamura celebensis Roepke, 1957
 Squamura disciplaga (Swinhoe, 1901)
 Squamura kinabalua (Holloway, 1976)
 Squamura maculata Heylaerts, 1890
 Squamura roepkei Holloway, 1982
 Squamura tenera Roepke, 1957

Former species
 Squamura sumatrana Roepke, 1957

References

External links
Natural History Museum Lepidoptera generic names catalog

Metarbelinae